Chicago XXXVI: Now, sometimes stylized as "NOW" Chicago XXXVI or Now: Chicago XXXVI, is the twenty-fourth studio album, and thirty-sixth overall by Chicago. It was written and recorded in 2013–2014, and was released on July 4, 2014. Aside from the occasional few new tracks found in the band's many compilation and cover albums, Now is the band's first full album of new compositions since 2006's Chicago XXX, (not including Chicago XXXII: Stone of Sisyphus, which was released in 2008 but recorded in 1993). This album has the first original Chicago credits for veteran musicians Walfredo Reyes, Jr. and Lou Pardini, since joining the band.

Production
The album was produced in a geographically distributed, "just-in-time" fashion. Noted by the band's cofounder Robert Lamm as "a very sort of disjointed way to work", Nows production model was largely enabled by a fully mobile system of the band's own design called "The Rig". It was recorded primarily in hotels and secondarily in studios along the band's American tour, constructed mostly from each musician's isolated performances between concert dates, and then synchronized via a private Web portal site for final overdubbing by coordinating producer and engineer Hank Linderman.  The band's songwriting members are each respectively credited as each track's "supervising producer".

Even throughout the album's year-long development, audio preview clips of each track were progressively released to the public online — some before they were completed by the addition of the band's signature brass section. The first preview, "Naked in the Garden of Allah", was released in April 2013, the album was finally made available for preorder in April 2014, and was released July 2014.

Reception

Beginning in April 2013, the Something Else! webzine engaged the band's progressively released preview clips. They said that "Naked in the Garden of Allah" "reanimates" the band's early "cutting" political messages, wherein "the lyrics, and the song's turbulent textures, speak to both the horrors of war and to Lamm's enduring pleas for peace". "Watching All the Colors" is said to resemble Robert Lamm's 2008 solo sessions from The Bossa Project, and "Something's Coming, I Know" "rumbles along with a more scuffed-up cadence — until it's broken up by this sun-streaked, Beatlesque bridge".  Recorded on the tour bus, Tris Imboden's drums on "Crazy Happy" are said to "sound modern and appropriate for the song and mesh seamlessly". They complement the album's percussion, as provided by "the great Walfredo Reyes Jr."

It entered the American Billboard 200 at number 82.

AllMusic's Stephen Erlewine assigned 3.5 stars out of 5, calling the album "united in sound and sensibility, anchored upon the splashy horn-fueled jazz-pop they pioneered in the '70s but usually returning to the slick professional adult contemporary of the '80s", with songs that are "big, smooth, cheerful, and bright, emphasizing melody over instrumental interplay, explicitly evoking the past without re-creating it".

Track listing

Personnel 

Chicago
 Robert Lamm – keyboards (2, 4, 5, 7, 8), horn arrangements (2, 4, 7, 8, 11), synthesizer (3), synth guitar (8), programming (10), lead vocals (1, 2, 4, 5, 7, 10, 11), backing vocals (1, 3), arrangements
 Lee Loughnane – trumpet (2, 5, 9-11), flugelhorn (3, 4, 6-8, 10), horn arrangements (3), horn transcriptions (5), lead vocals (7), backing vocals (1, 3, 7)
 James Pankow – trombone (2, 5-11), horn arrangements (5)
 Walter Parazaider – alto saxophone (7, 8, 10)
 Jason Scheff – bass guitar (2-11), synth bass (4), keyboards (4), acoustic guitars (6), acoustic piano (6), lead vocals (1, 4, 6, 9), backing vocals (1-3, 5, 7, 9), arrangements
 Tris Imboden – drums (2-11)
 Keith Howland – lead guitar (1), guitars (2-5, 7-11), Rhodes piano (9), horn arrangements (9), lead vocals (9), backing vocals (1, 5), arrangements
 Lou Pardini – keyboards (3, 9), organ (9), lead vocals (1-3, 8, 11), backing vocals (1, 5, 9)
 Walfredo Reyes, Jr. – percussion (2, 3, 5, 8, 9, 11)

Additional musicians
 Jeff Babko – horn arrangements (9)
 Luis Conte – percussion (1, 6)
 Dorian Crozier – drums (1)
 Daniel Fornero – trumpet (1), flugelhorn (1)
 Trent Gardner – horn arrangements (3-5, 10), trombone (5), synthesizers (5)
 Scheila Gonzalez – baritone saxophone (1), tenor saxophone (1)
 Ray Herrmann – alto saxophone (2), soprano saxophone (2), tenor saxophone (5, 9)
 Harry Kim – trumpet (1), flugelhorn (1), horn arrangements (1)
 Larry Klimas – alto saxophone (3, 4, 11)
 Nick Lane – horn transcriptions (2, 4, 7, 8, 11), trombone (3, 4)
 Hank Linderman – guitars (2), backing vocals (10), arrangements
 Steve Lu – synthesizers (6)
 John McFee – fiddle (10)
 Michael O'Neil – guitars (1)
 Tim Pierce – electric guitars (6)
 Philippe Saisse – keyboards (1)
 George Shelby – tenor saxophone (1)
 John Van Eps – synthesizers (11), programming (11), arrangements
 Arturo Velasco – trombone (1)
 Verdine White – bass guitar (1)
 David Williams – guitars (1)

Production

 Hank Linderman – coordinating producer, engineer, editing, mixing
 Phil Galdston – additional production and arrangements (Track 2)
 Drew Hester – drum track engineer
 Keith Howland – engineer (Tracks 5 and 9)
 Dave Collins – mastering 
 Rick Walsh – additional horn transcriptions
 Robert Lamm and Trent Gardner – art direction
 Trent Gardner with Rigel Blue Agency and Lucky Thirteen Designs – package design and graphics
The band's composers are each respectively credited as each track's "supervising producer".

Charts

References

External links
 
 , mentioning the production of NOW

2014 albums
Chicago (band) albums
Rhino Records albums
Progressive rock albums by American artists
Hard rock albums by American artists